Beat Meister (born 22 September 1965) is a Swiss former cyclist. He competed in the team time trial at the 1992 Summer Olympics.

References

External links
 

1965 births
Living people
Swiss male cyclists
Olympic cyclists of Switzerland
Cyclists at the 1992 Summer Olympics
Cyclists from Zürich